The Akaflieg München Mü12 Kiwi is a glider that was designed and built in Germany in 1935.

Development 
The Mü12 Kiwi was conceived in 1935 as a single-seat training glider of simple and rugged construction with a high strutted wing and a plywood covered rhomboid section fuselage. Flight testing revealed a glider with good control response but less than satisfactory approach control. Due to various problems certification of the Mü12 Kiwi was delayed to the end of 1935 and finally abandoned.

Specifications (Mü12 Kiwi)

References

1930s German sailplanes
Mu12
High-wing aircraft
Aircraft first flown in 1935